Wutach may refer to:
Wutach (river), a river in Baden-Württemberg
Wutach (municipality), a municipality through which the river flows
Wutach Gorge, a gorge system through which the river flows